Jonathan Erlich and Andy Ram were the defending champions; however, they lost to George Bastl and Chris Guccione in the final. The new champions won 7–5, 7–6(6).

Seeds

Draw

Draw

References
 Doubles Draw

Israel Open - Doubles
Israel Open